The Gonow Saboo (帅豹) is a mid-size crossover SUV (mid-size SUV produced since 2002 by the Chinese manufacturer Guangzhou Automobile under the Gonow brand.

Overview
The MSRP of the Gonow Saboo is 119,800 yuan. Design of the Gonow Saboo is controversial as it is visually heavily inspired by the first generation Kia Sorento, with the side profiles being mostly the same.

See also
 List of GAC vehicles

References

External links 

Saboo
Mid-size sport utility vehicles
Crossover sport utility vehicles
Rear-wheel-drive vehicles
All-wheel-drive vehicles
2010s cars
Cars introduced in 2010
Cars of China